Villanova University is a private Roman Catholic research university in Villanova, Pennsylvania. It was founded by the Augustinians in 1842 and named after Saint Thomas of Villanova. The university is the oldest Catholic university in Pennsylvania  and one of two Augustinian institutions in the United States (The other being Merrimack College). It is classified among "R2: Doctoral Universities – High research activity".

The university traces its roots to the old Saint Augustine's Church, Philadelphia, which the Augustinian friars of the Province of Saint Thomas of Villanova founded in 1796, and to its parish school, Saint Augustine's Academy, which was established in 1811. The school's identity remains deeply rooted in the Augustinian Catholic tradition and all students are required to take the Augustine and Culture Seminar (ACS) course their freshman year.

History

In October 1841, two Irish Augustinian friars from Saint Augustine's Church in Philadelphia, with the intention of starting a school, purchased 200 acres in Radnor Township, known as "Belle Air", the estate of the late John Rudolph, a merchant of Burlington, New Jersey and Philadelphia. The school, which was called the "Augustinian College of Villanova", opened in 1842. Besides the novitiate and college, the Augustinians had pastoral care of Catholics living within a fifteen mile radius. Bishop Francis Kenrick dedicated the chapel in 1844. Parished at Berwyn, Bryn Mawr, and Wayne developed from the Villanova mission

However, the Philadelphia Nativist Riots of 1844 that burned Saint Augustine's Church in Philadelphia caused financial difficulties for the Augustinians, and the college was closed in February 1845. The college reopened in 1846 and graduated its first class in 1847. In March 1848, the governor of Pennsylvania incorporated the school and gave it the power to grant degrees. In 1859, the first master's degree was conferred on a student. In 1857, the school closed again as the demand for priests in Philadelphia prevented adequate staffing, and the crisis of the Panic of 1857 strained the school financially. The school remained closed throughout the Civil War and was used as a military hospital. It reopened in September 1865; since then it has operated continuously. Its prep department later moved to Malvern, a town along the Main Line, and is still run by the order.

The School of Technology was established in 1905. In 1915, a two-year pre-medical program was established to help students meet medical schools' new requirements. This led to a four-year pre-medical program, the B.S. in biology, and the founding of the sciences division in 1926. During World War I, the college served as hospital for sufferng from influenza.

Villanova was all-male until 1918 when the college began evening classes to educate nuns to teach in parochial schools. In 1938, a laywoman received a Villanova degree for the first time. When the nursing school opened in 1953 women began attending Villanova full-time. In 1958, the College of Engineering admitted its first female student; other colleges admitted women only as commuters. Villanova University became fully coeducational in 1968.

During World War II, Villanova was one of 131 colleges and universities nationally that took part in the V-12 Navy College Training Program which offered students a path to a Navy commission. It has since graduated 25 US Naval Admirals and Marine Corps Generals, which is more than any other college or university with the exception of the Naval Academy in Annapolis.

After World War II, Villanova expanded, returning veterans swelling enrollments and the faculty growing fourfold. Additional facilities were built, and in 1953, the college of Nursing and the School of Law were established. Villanova achieved university status on November 18, 1953. Between 1954 and 1963, 10 new buildings were built or bought on land adjacent to the campus, including Bartley, Mendel, and Dougherty Halls.

Campus

The campus has roughly 1,500 trees. The campus was formerly known as Arboretum Villanova, but its status as an official arboretum was revoked after the university failed to meet rules and standards such as planting enough new trees and offering tours.

There are three named areas on the campus:
Main Campus contains most of the educational buildings, administration buildings, Student Center, Library, Bookstore, the University Church of St. Thomas of Villanova, Corr Chapel, the main cafeteria and a variety of coffee shops and eateries, the Athletic Center, the Pavilion, Villanova Stadium, and many sophomore student residences.
West Campus contains the Law School, St. Mary's hall (a large building for single housing, a cafeteria, classrooms, indoor swimming pool, market, etc.) some administrative buildings, and housing for juniors and some sophomores.  Also included are basketball and tennis courts, soccer fields, volleyball courts and barbecue grills. The SEPTA Paoli/Thorndale line's Villanova station is also located on West Campus. There is also the Law School parking garage in addition to apartment parking.
South Campus contains six freshman residence halls, Donohue Court (South Campus Cafeteria) and Donohue Market (South Campus Market). The Norristown High Speed Line has a stop right behind Stanford Hall. This part of campus also features a basketball court, sand volleyball court, and barbecue grills.

Main campus

The most prominent campus feature is St. Thomas of Villanova Church, whose dual spires are the university's tallest structure. The cornerstone was laid in 1883, and construction ended in 1887. Built in the Gothic Revival style, the church was renovated in 1943 and 1992. The church lies at the head of the path crossing Lancaster Avenue into the parking lots and toward South Campus. It is a popular meeting place for students, and hosts regular Masses for the student body. The church is home to St. Thomas of Villanova Parish, whose Masses take place Sunday morning. The stained-glass windows of the church depict the life of St. Augustine of Hippo.

Behind the Church is Mendel Field, around which sit six major campus buildings:
 Mendel Hall, named for pioneering geneticist and Augustinian monk Gregor Mendel, holds science labs, lecture halls, and other facilities. Its two large buildings are connected underground and by a second-floor indoor bridge that forms the gateway between West and Main Campus. In 1998, the college commissioned a  bronze sculpture of Mendel by Philadelphia sculptor James Peniston, and installed it outside the hall's entrance.
 Tolentine Hall, one of the oldest buildings on campus, houses classrooms, academic offices such as the Registrar's Office and the Office of the President, and computer labs, and is connected to Villanova's monastery, St. Thomas Hall. Tolentine Hall was formerly called Mendel Hall before the construction of the new Mendel Hall, as it was the former home of the various science departments, a fact which ultimately led to the building partially burning down more than once as a result of experiments gone wrong.
 White Hall, consisting mainly of classrooms and laboratories, is connected to the Chemical Engineering Building, which was built in 1947. Ironically, White Hall has an almost entirely black exterior.
 Falvey Hall, or "Old Falvey", is the annex of the Falvey Memorial Library, named for Rev. Daniel Falvey who served as librarian from 1940 until his death in 1962. It is home to some classrooms in the Art History and Education departments as well as some offices, along with the Augustinian Heritage Institute, and the Matthew J. Ryan Center. "Old Falvey" was home to the writing center and Math Learning Resource Center (MLRC) until both centers moved into Falvey Memorial Library's renovated second floor during the 2012–2013 academic year. "Old Falvey" is also home to a recently renovated reading room, which opened in the 2016–2017 academic year.
 John Barry Hall, named for naval officer Commodore John Barry, houses the Navy ROTC Program.
 To the west of the Church, the Center for Engineering Education and Research (CEER), which opened in 1998, holds engineering labs, engineering classrooms, an engineering computer lab, an auditorium hall for projections and slideshows, and a Holy Grounds, which is the name of Villanova's coffee shops.

Slightly east of Mendel Field sits the Campus Green, a landscaped haven between Falvey Library and two residence halls: Alumni Hall, home to the Service Learning Community; and Corr Hall, a building that consists of first-floor offices, student housing, and a semi-detached chapel which hosts daily Masses. Often home to outdoor masses and other large gatherings, the Campus Green used to include a statue depicting Our Lady of Good Counsel and plaques dedicated to the veterans of World War II and the Vietnam War, but these were moved to the Grotto, which is between St. Rita's Hall and Austin Hall, two residence halls across from Alumni Hall that also house the Campus Ministry Office and University Admissions Office, respectively. The Grotto also is the location of daily student-led praying of the Rosary.

Alumni Hall dates back to 1848 and stands as one of the oldest structures on campus. The school was closed in 1861 due to the Civil War and reopened in 1865. In that time this hall is believed to have been used as a military hospital and potential evidence of that use, such as a pulley located at the top of the main stairwell for moving bodies up and down, can still be seen. The building was used as a hospital again for influenza patients after World War I.

St. Mary's Hall was built in 1962. Laid out with long corridors and over a thousand rooms, there is a large chapel and many partial floors, basements and sub-basements to feed the legends of blocked-off wings. St. Mary's houses the Villanova Human Resource Development (HRD) program for graduate students as well as the main office for the university's "Tech Zone". The property on which Dundale Hall is located was originally purchased by an industrialist, Israel Morris II, in 1874, and was built as a mansion for his family. Purchased from his family in 1978, it has been used for a variety of meetings and is home to several offices.

Falvey Library, the campus's main research library, houses over 1 million books, thousands of periodicals, television production studios, and quiet places for solitary or group study, as well as the campus's writing center and Math Learning Resource Center, which moved from "Old Falvey" to the renovated second floor of the library during the 2012–2013 academic year. Behind Falvey Library is the Saint Augustine Center for Liberal Arts, commonly called "SAC", which is home to many departments in the College of Liberal Arts, numerous offices, several seminar-type classrooms, and the Advising and Professional Development Program. In 2022, Falvey Library received a 20 million dollar donation to renovate and update the library.

East of Corr Hall sits Kennedy Hall, named for the late President John F. Kennedy and the late Senator Robert F. Kennedy (both of whom spoke at Villanova commencement ceremonies), which houses the University Shop, the campus bookstore, as well as the Office of Residence Life, the Bursar's Office, the Office of Financial Aid, and the Main Campus mailroom. Across a small courtyard is Dougherty Hall, the campus's main dining hall, referred to as "The Pit" because of its underground location, one of three all-you-can-eat facilities on campus. Dougherty also houses several smaller eateries and many Student Activity Offices. Next to Kennedy is Connelly Center with its radically different architecture resembling an alpine ski lodge, containing: the Belle Aire Terrace, which serves a variety of food; several meeting rooms; areas for group study; the Commuter Student Lounge on the upper level; another lounge on the lower level, the campus cinema (movie theater); a large conference room; a smoothie shop; and a Holy Grounds location.

Between the dining halls of Dougherty and the meeting halls of Connelly is a sculpture titled "The Awakenening" (unofficially referred to as "The Oreo"). A large white-and-black sculpture by Jay Dugan, some of the major campus celebrations have occurred in its circular shadow – including celebratory vandalism in the wake of the 1985 NCAA Men's Basketball Championship, and again after the 2016 and 2018 Men's Basketball Championships.

Still further east, there is "The Quad" where there lies a square formation between two dormitories, Sheehan Hall and Sullivan Hall. These halls are considered main campus housing for students. Bartley Hall, home to the Villanova School of Business is the last building before Ithan Avenue, which is where main campus ends. Bartley is home to "The Exchange" food restaurant where students can find sandwiches named after the financial sector. Bartley is adjacent to another entrance to Main Campus, at the intersection of Lancaster Avenue and Ithan Avenue. Behind Bartley Hall are two new buildings: The Health Services Building, home to the Counseling and Medical Centers; and Driscoll Hall, home to the M. Louise Fitzpatrick College of Nursing.

On the south side of Lancaster avenue sits south main campus. A new parking garage was opened in January 2017. A pedestrian bridge over Lancaster Avenue connecting south and main campus and senior housing known as The Commons were opened in the summer of 2019.

The Commons
The Commons opened in August 2019 and serves as apartment-style housing for senior students. In addition to housing, the Commons also has a state-of-the-art gym, spin gym, gym studio space, a mailroom, a tech center, a Parliament Cafe and a full-service dining option called The Refectory Bar and Grill.

The Commons is home to the following six residence halls:

 McGuinn Hall
 Canon Hall
 Dobbin Hall
 Hovnanian Hall
 Friar Hall
 Trinity Hall

On the opposite side of Ithan Avenue is the John and Joan Mullen Center for the Performing Arts which opened the weekend of April 24, 2020.

West Campus
Situated across the SEPTA tracks north and west of Mendel hall is West Campus: home to St. Mary's Hall, the West Campus Apartments, and the Law School. St. Mary's, a labyrinthine building of classrooms, residence rooms, a cafeteria, and large chapel, was originally built as a seminary, and was once home to the College of Nursing. St. Mary's also houses many of the undergraduate student performing arts groups. Behind St. Mary's sit the Apartments – eight buildings that house junior and senior resident students. A small Augustinian residence, Burns Hall, also sits on West Campus and is the home to the university president. Picotte Hall at Dundale, a historic mansion on the grounds of a former estate, lies just beyond Burns Hall at the far end of West Campus and is home to University Advancement, the school's phone-a-thon, and several other university offices.

In addition to the student dormitories in St. Mary's Hall, West Campus is home to the following residence halls:

 Farley Hall
 Galen Hall
 Jackson Hall
 Klekotka Hall
 Moulden Hall
 Rudolph Hall
 St. Clare Hall
 Welsh Hall

South Campus
Sitting diagonally across Lancaster Ave. and Ithan Ave. from Bartley Hall, South Campus is home to several residence halls – usually reserved for underclassmen – and Donahue Hall, home to "The Spit", short for "South Pit". Donahue hall also houses Donahue Market, commonly referred to by students as "The Sparket".

The South Campus residence halls are:

 Stanford Hall
 Good Counsel Hall
 Katharine Hall
 Caughlin Hall
 St. Monica Hall
 Mcguire Hall

Stanford Hall also houses the Office for Residence Life on the ground floor.

The second and third of three on-campus train stops, the Villanova stop and the Stadium stop on the Norristown High Speed Line provides access to the city of Philadelphia, about 30 minutes away.

Academics
According to the National Science Foundation, Villanova spent $20.7 million on research and development in 2018, ranking it 267th in the nation.

Rankings
U.S. News & World Report ranks Villanova as tied for the 51st best National University in the U.S. for 2022, 49th in 2022.   For more than a decade, Villanova University had been ranked No. 1 by U.S. News & World Report in the Best Masters Universities-category, Northern Region, a ranking for schools which offer undergraduate and masters programs but few doctoral programs. U.S. News & World Report in 2016 also ranked Villanova as second for "Best Value Schools" and fourth for "Best Undergraduate Teaching" in the Best Masters Universities-category, Northern Region, and ranked the engineering school No.11 among all national undergraduate engineering programs whose highest degree is a masters.

The Villanova School of Business was ranked No. 1 in the U.S. in Bloomberg Businessweeks 2016 rankings of undergraduate business schools, but this led to controversy and challenge. As a result Bloomberg no longer ranked undergraduate business schools after 2016. In 2007 Villanova was No. 29 in the Financial Times''' ranking of top executive MBA programs. However, for the 2023 U.S. News & World Report Rankings of best business schools, Villanova was unranked.

Villanova University School of Law is currently ranked tied for 65th among all U.S. law schools by the 2019 edition of U.S. News & World Reports "Best Law Schools". The School of Law had previously suffered a drop in ranking in 2011, after it was determined that law school admissions staff had engaged in inflating reported LSAT scores for admitted students. According to the ABA, these infractions were enough to justify a removal of the school's accreditation, however the quick response to the issue by the university resulted only in a censure of the school.

In a deliberate move to classify itself as a "national university", Villanova pushed hard in early 2010s to expand its doctoral programs to reach the Carnegie threshold of 20 PhDs per year. In September 2016, the university's Carnegie Classification was changed to classify Villanova among "R2:Doctoral Universities: High Research Activity". U.S. News & World Report, which relies on this classification to define which schools should be called "national universities", included Villanova in its "National Universities" rankings for the first time in fall 2016. Before this move, Villanova was ranked in U.S. News & World Report’s Regional Universities–North category.

In July 2022, U.S. News & World Report removed Villanova from its list of “Best Value Colleges” due to incorrect data reported.

Admissions

Admission to Villanova has been deemed "most selective" by U.S. News & World Report. The university offers three ways to apply: Early Decision (binding), Early Action and Regular Decision.

For Fall 2022, Villanova received 23,813 freshmen applications; 5,477 were admitted (23%) for a class of 1700. The middle 50% GPA range: 4.17–4.56 on a weighted 4.00 scale. The middle 50% SAT scores of the recently admitted class: 1430-1520/1600, ACT: 32-35/36.

In 2019, Villanova announced new recruiting partnerships with The Posse Foundation, Philadelphia Futures and the Guadalupe Center.

Student life

Villanova's student organizations include standard club sports, cultural organizations, Greek-letter fraternities and sororities, and more. Villanova students participate in charitable and philanthropic activities and organizations, including the largest student-run Special Olympics in the world.

Charity and community service organizations

Being a Roman Catholic Augustinian school, the university has an active Campus Ministry.

The annual Special Olympics Fall Festival at Villanova University is the largest and most successful student-run Special Olympics in the world. It draws more than 1,000 athletes and 400 coaches from 44 Pennsylvania counties. Athletes may advance through the festival to regional and international competition. Students apply to be a part of the 82-volunteer planning committee, which works for more than nine months alongside Special Olympics Pennsylvania (SOPA), which oversees more than 300 events statewide. The event is put on with the aid of some 2,500 student volunteers and more than 1,000 other volunteers from the Villanova community.

Villanova University holds an annual NOVAdance year-long fundraising effort that culminates with a 12-hour dance marathon each Spring, raising money in support of the Andrew McDonough B+ (Be Positive) Foundation. NOVAdance began in 2014, and has since then become a yearly event.

The Villanova University community is noted for its participation in Habitat for Humanity In 2004, Villanova had more participants in the Habitat for Humanity Collegiate Challenge than any other U.S. university.

Villanova's School of Engineering maintains a student chapter of Engineers Without Borders, a non-profit organization that focuses on helping to improve the living conditions of communities worldwide. Villanova EWB is one of the fasting growing student organizations on campus, expanding from a mere handful of engineering students in the spring of 2006 to a current membership of approximately 75 students in multi-disciplinary programs.

The chapter's inaugural project was to design and build a playground for a grade school in New Orleans following the tragic events of Hurricane Katrina. Villanova EWB was the only student organization to win an award from the regional Project Management Institute, receiving an Honorable Mention from PMI for project of the year. The most recent project involved designing and building a water treatment and distribution system which provided an orphanage and surrounding villages in northern Thailand with drinking water and irrigation for their crops. There are also plans for a variety of projects in the Philadelphia area, including K-12 outreach programs, as well as many more international projects.

The Blue Key Society consists of around 200 volunteer campus tour guides who work with the Admissions Office to give three tours each weekday, various special tours as needed and selected weekend tours throughout the school year.

Formerly known as Project Sunshine, The Office of Community Service, commonly called "Rays of Sunshine", is a student-led community service organization.

Student Government Association
Founded in 1925, the Student Government Association (SGA) operates through its three branches (the Executive Branch, the Senate, and the Judicial Council). The Executive Branch is led by the President of the Student Body and Executive Vice President, and consists of the Chief of Staff and Directors of Athletics; Diversity, Equity, and Inclusion; Finance; Programming; and Public Relations. The Senate is led by the Speaker of the Senate and consists of thirty-four Senators total, twenty-two elected representatives from the classes and schools and twelve appointed representatives from University offices and student organizations. The Judicial Council is led by the Chief Justice and consists of four Associate Justices and a Judicial Clerk.

Greek life
Roughly 30% of Villanova students identify with one of eleven fraternities, twelve sororities, and one service fraternity. There are no fraternity or sorority houses on-campus.

The first Greek organization at the school was established in 1902 as a social organization and circle of individuals interested in classical studies. The oldest Greek organization still on campus is the Sigma Nu Fraternity, whose Kappa Zeta chapter grew out of the former local Zeta Rho fraternity, founded in 1969. Zeta Rho gave way to the Kappa Zeta Chapter of Sigma Nu Fraternity in 1983.

Sororities
National Panhellenic Conference sororities
 Alpha Gamma Delta
 Alpha Chi Omega
 Alpha Phi
 Delta Delta Delta
 Delta Gamma
 Kappa Delta
 Kappa Kappa Gamma
 Chi Omega

National Pan-Hellenic Council sororities
 Alpha Kappa Alpha
 Delta Sigma Theta

National Association of Latino Fraternal Organizations sorority
 Lambda Theta Alpha

National APIDA Panhellenic Association sorority
 Sigma Psi Zeta

Fraternities
North American Interfraternity Conference Fraternities

 Beta Theta Pi
 Delta Chi
 Delta Tau Delta
 Lambda Chi Alpha
 Pi Kappa Phi
 Phi Sigma Kappa
 Sigma Chi
 Sigma Nu
 Sigma Phi Epsilon
National Pan-Hellenic Council Fraternity
 Kappa Alpha Psi
 Omega Psi Phi
National Association of Latino Fraternal Organizations fraternity
 Phi Iota Alpha
 La Unidad Latina, Lambda Upsilon Lambda

Service fraternity
The Sigma Eta chapter of Alpha Phi Omega, whose motto is "Leadership, Friendship, and Service", meets weekly on Villanova's campus to plan service projects on and off campus, including school cleanups through Philly Cares Day, working at soup kitchens and tutoring children in Math and Science at Philadelphia public schools.

Villanova Emergency Medical Service
Villanova Emergency Medical Service (VEMS), is a student-run ambulance service licensed and dedicated to serving the campus community. VEMS membership consists of more than 40 undergraduate student volunteers; the majority of whom are certified as Emergency Medical Technicians, volunteering more than 25,000 hours annually. Villanova is one of only a handful of colleges to provide EMS services to their campus, and one of only 52 who provide emergency response and transport to at least the Basic Life Support (BLS) Level. VEMS has been recognized on a national level multiple times by the National Collegiate EMS Foundation (NCEMSF), specifically being named 2001 Campus Organization of the Year and receiving EMS website of the year in 2000, 2004, and 2006. Their skills competition team also placed in second at the 2011 Annual Physio-Control BLS Skills Competition. The team consisted of Capt. William Pandos, Lt. Christopher Cahill, Lt. John Skinner, Treasurer Philip Walker, EMT Erin Mack, and EMT Kyle Lewis. VEMS hosted the second annual NCEMSF Conference in 1995 as well as the twelfth annual conference in Philadelphia in 2005.

Campus publications and mediaThe Villanovan has been an officially recognized and accredited student newspaper since its founding in 1916. The university's newspaper of record, the tabloid-sized weekly usually produces 12 issues per semester, at 6,500 copies per issue.The Belle Air Yearbook is the official yearbook of the university and has been a student made production since 1922. The book is published by the L.G. Balfour Company. The book has won numerous awards over the years including the prestigious Columbia Scholastic Press Association Gold Crown Award in 1988 and 1989 and the Yearbook Award for their 2017 book and the National Yearbook Sample Award for their 2019 publication.The Villanova Times, the independent bi-weekly student newspaper, won the Collegiate Network Award for Layout and Design in 2005–06, 2007–08 and 2008–09.

WVTV is the student-run campus television station. Starting in 1999 as the Villanova TV Production Club, the station produces news, events, films and other programming for the Villanova community, and can be seen on the campus television network.

WXVU, the FCC-licensed student-operated FM radio station, operates at 89.1 megahertz. With an output of 75 watts, WXVU can be heard for  around the campus and globally via the internet. Since 1991, the station has offered a varied program of music, news, sports, public affairs, and specialty programming. WXVU is the successor to WKVU/WWVU, the university-sponsored student-run carrier-current station organized in 1946 by a group of electrical engineering students who had served in World War II as radio operators.

POLIS Literary Magazine, a student publication printed once a semester by the Villanova University Honors Program, features writing and artwork by Villanova students and professors. Each issue features creative nonfiction, poetry, short fiction, and black-and-white photography focusing on a central theme. Each issue also features articles on literature, entertainment, and dining.Concept is an interdisciplinary journal of graduate studies sponsored by the Graduate Division of the College of Liberal Arts and Sciences. The 2009 student film Price of Life received critical attention.

NROTC
Villanova NROTC is part of the Philadelphia NROTC Consortium; consisting of Villanova University and the University of Pennsylvania (including the cross town agreements with Drexel and Temple University). Located in Commodore John Barry Hall, the NROTC has been a part of the university since immediately after World War II. The battalion consists of more than 100 Navy and Marine Corps midshipmen under the advisement of a staff of Navy and Marine Corps officers and senior enlisted members.

Midshipmen in the Villanova NROTC program are required to take specific Navy and Marine Corps classes, wear their service's uniform on Tuesdays and Thursdays, attend daily physical training events, participate in extra-curricular programs that range from sports teams to rifle-shooting, and adhere to the basic premise that "a midshipman does not lie, cheat, or steal".

Since its inception in the summer of 1946, the NROTC unit on campus has produced 25 Admirals and Generals in the United States Navy and Marine Corps. At one point, there had only been two four-star generals in the U.S. Marine Corps, one of them the Commandant of the Marine Corps, and they had both been graduates of Villanova NROTC. In 2004, the commanders of both U.S. Naval Forces Atlantic (Admiral William J. Fallon) and U.S. Naval Forces Pacific (Admiral Walter F. Doran) were Villanova NROTC graduates. Admiral Fallon was later assigned as Commander, U.S. Central Command from March 2007 to March 2008. ADM Fallon was the first Navy officer to hold that position.

Student performing arts
Villanova University is without a formal music department; therefore, the Office of Student Performing Arts is charged with the organization of the student performing arts groups on campus. Due to the lack of a music department, student musicians are from every school in the university. Nearly 10% of the student body participates in various music related organizations.

The Villanova Band is the largest and oldest musical group at Villanova with over 100 members. The Villanova Band has four divisions: the Concert Band, the Scramble Band, the Pep Band, and the Jazz Ensemble. The Concert Band plays one concert at the end of each semester. It also performs throughout the Villanova community and on its annual "Fall Tour". The Scramble Band performs for Villanova Football games between plays and at halftime on the field. The Villanova Pep Band performs at Villanova Men's and Women's Basketball games, including post-season games such as the Big East Tournament. The Jazz Ensemble and Orchestra have end-of-semester concerts and perform on campus and around the Philadelphia area several times a year. The band is made up of students of every school within Villanova.

The second-largest musical group at Villanova, the Pastoral Musicians have about 60 voices and 35 instrumentalists, primarily undergraduates, up from 30 musicians in 1995. Their musical selection shows the diversity of style within the Roman Catholic tradition: contemporary praise music from different cultures, Bach, Palestrina, Mozart, Lauridsen, and others.

Villanova's men's chorus, the Villanova Singers, was founded in 1953 by Dean Harold Gill Reuschlein, then Dean of the Law School. The Singers were established for the stated purpose of singing various types of music and enriching the cultural life of the university. Entirely student-run, the Singers are governed by a nine-member board of students and sing a wide range of musical styles and types, ranging from classical to contemporary. Within the Singers, there exists a smaller, student-directed a cappella group known as the Spires. Alumni of the Spires include Jim Croce, Tommy West and Manhattan Transfer member Tim Hauser.

The Villanova Voices women's chorus is the oldest women's organization at the university. Originally called the Villanova Women's Glee Club, the group was founded by 20 women from the university's College of Nursing in 1960, shortly after Villanova became coeducational. Their attendant a cappella group, the Haveners, is student-directed.

Athletics

Villanova University teams are known as the Wildcats. They compete as a member of the NCAA Division I level, primarily competing in the Big East Conference. The Wildcats previously competed in the Eastern 8 Conference from 1975 to 1976 to 1979–80. Men's sports include baseball, basketball, cross country, football, golf, lacrosse, soccer, swimming & diving, tennis and track & field; while women's sports include basketball, cross country, field hockey, lacrosse, rowing, soccer, softball, swimming & diving, tennis, track & field, volleyball and water polo. The football and rowing team competes in the Colonial Athletic Association, while the women's lacrosse team competes in the Patriot League.

The Wildcats are also part of the Philadelphia Big 5, the traditional Philadelphia-area basketball rivalry. Their fiercest crosstown rivalry is with Saint Joseph's University ("St. Joe's"), the city's Jesuit university, and matches between them are called the "Holy War".

In the NCAA graduation report released on November 17, 2020, Villanova has a graduation-success rate (GSR) of 97 percent rate in the NCAA GSR method. In the GSR release, Villanova had 12 of its athletic programs post a perfect 100 percent graduation success rate for the 2010-2013 cohort. This data measures the percentage of student-athletes who entered college on institutional aid (whether athletics-based aid or otherwise) between those years and graduated within six years. Villanova had seven women's programs and five men's programs earn a 100 percent GSR in the release. The Villanova women's and men's basketball team are among the athletic program's 14 teams with a 100 percent graduation rate for 2010–13.

The school's athletic teams have won numerous NCAA Division I national titles, most notably in Men's Basketball and Track & Field. In addition, the football team won the 2009 national title in the Football Championship Subdivision (formerly Division I-AA).

Men's basketball

In 1985, under the direction of coach Rollie Massimino, the men's basketball team won the NCAA Division I men's basketball tournament in the first year of the 64-team field. The final game, against defending champion and ten-point-favorite Georgetown, is often cited among the greatest upsets in college basketball history.

In 2005, under the direction of coach Jay Wright, Villanova's men's basketball team reached the NCAA tournament Sweet 16, losing to No. 1 seed and eventual champion North Carolina. In 2005–2006, the team began the year ranked No. 4 in the major polls from USA Today and the Associated Press. A 75–62 loss to eventual champion Florida ended the team's run for a second NCAA championship in the Regional Final. This team was led by a four guard set, a unique type of lineup designed by coach Jay Wright. In the 2006–2007 season, the Wildcats had a record of 22–11, and lost to Kentucky in the first round of the 2007 tournament. In the 2008 NCAA Division I men's basketball tournament, the team was eliminated by the top-seeded, eventual champion Kansas Jayhawks in the Sweet 16, after upsetting the fifth seeded Clemson Tigers in the first round and defeating the thirteenth seeded Siena Saints in the second round. In the 2009 tournament, the Wildcats upset the No. 1 seed Pittsburgh Panthers on a last second shot by guard Scottie Reynolds to win the East Region and advance to the Final Four. The team was then defeated by the eventual champion North Carolina Tar Heels in the 2009 Final Four game.

In 2016, the Wildcats won the 2016 NCAA Championship by defeating North Carolina 77–74. The game included the only buzzer-beater in NCAA Championship game history, when Kris Jenkins sank a three pointer to win the game.

In 2018, Villanova defeated the Michigan Wolverines 79–62 to win the 2018 NCAA Championship in San Antonio. The game was notable for featuring the highest scoring bench-player in NCAA Championship history in Donte Divincenzo, who scored 31 points and was awarded the Final Four MVP Award.

The home venues for the Wildcats include the on-campus 6,500 seat Finneran Pavilion for smaller attendance games, as well as the larger 20,478 seat Wells Fargo Center (known formerly under a variety of bank names) within the South Philadelphia Sports Complex. The February 13, 2006 meeting between Villanova and the University of Connecticut set the record for the highest attendance at a college basketball game in Pennsylvania, with 20,859 attendees.

Football

The Villanova men's football team competes in the NCAA Football Championship Subdivision (formerly Division I-AA) in the Colonial Athletic Association. On December 18, 2009, the team were CAA conference champions and defeated the Montana Grizzlies to be crowned the 2009 NCAA Division I-AA champions. The university continues to play in the Colonial Athletic Association for football as the new, restructured Big East Conference does not include football as a conference sport. The football team went on to win the CAA Conference once more in 2021, and advanced to the NCAA FCS quarterfinals

According to some sources, the 1906 Villanova team is credited with completing the first legal forward pass in football history.

Men's lacrosse

The Villanova men's lacrosse team competes in NCAA Division I as a member of the Big East Conference. Through 2009, Villanova men's lacrosse was a member of the Colonial Athletic Association and in 2009, Villanova won the CAA tournament as the fourth seed (the lowest-seeded championship team in conference history) for its first title. The team also made its first NCAA tournament appearance that year.

Women's cross country
In 2009 and 2010, the women's cross country team won the NCAA National Championships under Coach Gina Procaccio. The 2010 victory was led by individual national champion Sheila Reid of Villanova. The Wildcats also hold the NCAA record for the most Division 1 team and individual wins in women's cross country with nine team victories ('89, '90, '91, '92, '93, '94, '98, '09, '10) and eight individual champions, seven of which coincided.

Track and field
Villanova University's track and field team has a long history of athletic success that has spanned from Big East Conference Championships to NCAA Championships.

The men's team has produced 69 NCAA Championships, 36 Indoor and 33 Outdoor. The team has had eight NCAA team Championships (four Cross Country, three Indoor, one Outdoor). Villanova has produced 28 athletes who have made appearances in the Olympics, 10 of whom have medaled (seven gold medals, three silver medals). The men's team has also won 112 Penn Relay Championships, which stands as the most wins by any school. The men's current coaches include head coach Marcus O'Sullivan and assistant head coach Anthony Williams.

The women's team has also had a multitude of success, producing 11 Big East team Championships and nine NCAA team Championships, most recently winning the 2009 and 2010 NCAA Cross Country Championships. They have also produced nine Olympians including Ron Delany, Eamonn Coghlan, Vicki Huber, Sonia O'Sullivan, Kim Certain, Kate Fonshell, Jen Rhines, Carmen Douma, and Carrie Tollefson. The Women's team has won 28 Penn Relay Championships, which is the most wins by any women's team. The current women's coaches include head coach Gina Procaccio and assistant head coach Anthony Williams.

At least one Villanovan athlete has competed in every Summer Olympics since 1948, winning a total of 13 medals (nine gold, four silver).

Traditions

The University Seal
An adaptation of the seal of the Order of St. Augustine, the seal of Villanova University is one of the campus's most ubiquitous images, adorning everything from buildings to chairs to backpacks. A ribbon carries the university motto: Veritas, Unitas, Caritas (Truth, Unity, and Charity), virtues to which every member of the Villanova community should aspire. A book symbolizes Augustine's dedication to education and the New Testament where he found Christianity. A cincture is part of the habit worn by members of the Order of Saint Augustine. Hovering above is the flaming heart, symbol of Augustine's search for God and his love of neighbors. Behind the book is the crosier – a staff traditionally held by a Bishop – commemorating Augustine's service as Bishop of Hippo. Above and behind the book are two crosses, symbolic of Augustine's conversion and the university's commitment to Catholicism. Framing the central portion of the seal is a laurel wreath exemplifying victory through the pursuit of knowledge, and 1842 is the year of the university's founding. Surrounding the seal is the incorporated fide of the university: Universitas Villanova In Statu Pennsylvaniae''.

The Liberty Bell's "Sister Bell"

Villanova University was home to the Liberty Bell's "Sister Bell", the replacement bell ordered from the Whitechapel Bell Foundry after the original bell cracked in 1753. This new bell was installed at the Pennsylvania State House (Independence Hall), and attached to the State House clock. The Sister Bell rang the hours until the late 1820s, when the bell was removed during a renovation and loaned to the Olde St. Augustine Church in Philadelphia. In 1829, the bell was hung in a new cupola and tower designed by architect William Strickland. There it remained until May 8, 1844, when it was destroyed, along with the Olde St. Augustine Church, during the Philadelphia Nativist riots. The friars of the Order of Saint Augustine had the "Sister Bell" recast and transferred to Villanova University. The bell was moved off campus in 2011.

At the university's centennial celebration, the bell was rung by Archbishop Dennis Joseph Dougherty to open the ceremonies. In 1954, the bell was displayed as part of an exhibit at Gimbels department store in Philadelphia that focused on the growth and development of the university. The Sister Bell is currently enshrined in the Heritage Room on the basement floor of the St. Augustine Monastery on Villanova's campus.

Alumni

Villanova University has produced many notable alumni:

Golden Globe-nominated actress Maria Bello, NBC News (WCAU) and Emmy Award-winning news anchor Keith Jones, actor Jon Polito, NFL Hall of Famer, longtime FOX commentator and actor Howie Long, founder of Manhattan Transfer Tim Hauser, singer-songwriters Jim Croce and Don McLean, Tony Award-winning playwright and screenwriter David Rabe, fashion model and entrepreneur Katherine Parr,  professional athletes Brian Westbrook, Matt Szczur, Kerry Kittles, Alvin Williams, Kevin Reilly, Kyle Lowry, professional wrestler Wheeler Yuta, Michael Bradley, and Boston Celtic Allan Ray.

Villanova has produced several military and governmental officials, including former Pennsylvania Governor Ed Rendell, former New Hampshire Senator Kelly Ayotte (Villanova Law), and former Connecticut Governor John G. Rowland. Wife to the governor and federal judge for the United States Court of Appeals for the Third Circuit, Marjorie Rendell, is also a graduate. Numerous Marine generals and Naval Admirals are products of Villanova's Naval ROTC program, including William J. Fallon, Admiral in the United States Navy and Commander of United States Central Command; George B. Crist, Marine General and the first Marine to be designated Commander in Chief, Central Command; and Joe Clancy, former Director of the United States Secret Service.  Another graduate, Paul X. Kelley, served as Commandant of the United States Marine Corps.

In business, alumni include Robert J. Darretta, Jr. – chief financial officer and vice chairman of Johnson & Johnson, John Drosdick – former CEO of Sunoco, and Thomas G. Labrecque – former chairman and CEO of Chase Manhattan Bank.

Other notable alumni include John Joseph O'Connor, Cardinal Archbishop of the Archdiocese of New York, John L. Hennessy, former president of Stanford University, Deirdre Imus, head of the Deirdre Imus Environmental Center for Pediatric Oncology (and wife to radio host Don Imus), and Sean Carroll, a cosmologist and science popularizer.

See also

 Education in Philadelphia
 Roman Catholicism in the United States

Notes

References

External links

 Official website

 
1842 establishments in Pennsylvania
Association of Catholic Colleges and Universities
Augustinian universities and colleges
Catholic universities and colleges in Pennsylvania
Educational institutions established in 1842
Radnor Township, Delaware County, Pennsylvania
Universities and colleges in Delaware County, Pennsylvania
Universities and colleges in Philadelphia